Wolfson College Boat Club is rowing club for the members of both Wolfson College, Oxford and St Cross College, Oxford. The club has competed since 1969 and takes part in the collegiate competitions Torpids and Summer Eights. Due to the membership being drawn from graduate colleges, the club races actively during the vacation periods at external races. Both squads also participate in the annual head races in London on the tideway (HoRR, WEHoRR, and HOR4s).

The Club
Wolfson Boat Club shares the University College Boathouse with Somerville, St Peter's, and Univ. This is a new building, constructed in 2007. It is situated on the far side of the river from the town, next to Queen's College Recreation Ground, and primarily accessible along the river's bridle path. Prior to the use of this building, a different building was used, one situated in the same place. The previous building burnt down in 1999.

Racing 
The starting positions for both Torpids and Summer Eights are determined by the results from the previous year, but Wolfson has shown good results for both men's and women's squads since entering bumps races. Currently, three boats for the men's squad and three for the women's squad are pre-qualified in both events due to previous successes. In 2019, Wolfson Boat Club celebrated both its 50th anniversary and achieving, for the first time, Women's Headship, which is the highest ranking possible in Bumps racing.

References

External links
Wolfson College Boat Club Website
Oxford Bumps Charts

Rowing clubs of the University of Oxford
Wolfson College, Oxford
1969 establishments in England
Sports clubs established in 1969
Rowing clubs in Oxfordshire
Rowing clubs of the River Thames